Centralia Township is located in Marion County, Illinois. As of the 2010 census, its population was 15,042 and it contained 7,360 housing units.

Geography 

Centralia township (T1N R1E) is centered at 38°31'N 89°5'W (38.517, -89.087). The city of Centralia is located in the western part of the township. The township is traversed by U.S. Route 51 (north-south) and by State Route 161 (east-west).

Demographics

Adjacent townships 
 Sandoval Township (north)
 Odin Township (north)
 Salem Township (northeast)
 Raccoon Township (east)
 Rome Township, Jefferson County (southeast)
 Grand Prairie Township, Jefferson County (south)
 Irvington Township, Washington County (southwest and west)
 Brookside Township, Clinton County (west)
 Meridian Township, Clinton County (northwest)

References

External links
City-data.com
Illinois State Archives

Townships in Marion County, Illinois
Townships in Illinois